The 1948 Yugoslav Women's Basketball League is the 4th season of the Yugoslav Women's Basketball League, the highest professional basketball league in Yugoslavia for women's. Championships is played in 1948 in Belgrade and played six teams. Champion for this season is Crvena zvezda.

Table

External links
 History of league

Yugoslav Women's Basketball League seasons
Women
1948 in women's basketball
basketball